Intertrigo refers to a type of inflammatory rash (dermatitis) of the superficial skin that occurs within a person's body folds. These areas are more susceptible to irritation and subsequent infection due to factors that promote skin breakdown such as moisture, friction, and exposure to bodily secretions and excreta such as sweat, urine, or feces. Areas of the body which are more likely to be affected by intertrigo include the inframammary fold, intergluteal cleft, armpits, and spaces between the fingers or toes. Skin affected by intertrigo is more prone to infection than intact skin.

The term "intertrigo" commonly refers to a secondary infection with bacteria (such as Corynebacterium minutissimum), fungi (such as Candida albicans), or viruses. A frequent manifestation is candidal intertrigo.

Intertrigo occurs more often in warm and humid conditions. Generally, intertrigo is more common in people with a weakened immune system including children, the elderly, and immunocompromised people. The condition is also more common in people who experience urinary incontinence and decreased ability to move.

Cause
An intertrigo usually develops from the chafing of warm, moist skin in the areas of the inner thighs and genitalia, the armpits, under the breasts, the underside of the belly, behind the ears, and the web spaces between the toes and fingers. An intertrigo usually appears red and raw-looking, and may also itch, ooze, and be sore. Intertrigos occur more often among overweight individuals, those with diabetes, those restricted to bed rest or diaper use, and those who use medical devices, like artificial limbs, that trap moisture against the skin.  Also, there are several skin diseases that can cause an intertrigo to develop, such as dermatitis or inverse psoriasis.

Bacterial
Bacterial intertrigo can be caused by Streptococci and Corynebacterium minutissimum.

Diagnosis
Intertrigo can be diagnosed clinically by a medical professional after taking a thorough history and performing a detailed physical examination. Many other skin conditions can mimic intertrigo's appearance including erythrasma, inverse psoriasis, scabies, pyoderma, atopic dermatitis, candidiasis, seborrheic dermatitis, and fungal infections of the superficial skin caused by Tinea versicolor or Tinea corporis.

Treatment
Intertrigo is treated by addressing associated infections, by removing moisture from the site, and by using substances at the site to help maintain skin integrity. If the individual is overweight, losing weight may also help. Relapses of intertrigo are common.

Keeping the area of the intertrigo dry and exposed to the air can help prevent recurrences, as can removing moisture from the area using absorbent fabrics or body powders, including plain cornstarch and judiciously used antiperspirants.

Greases, oils, and barrier ointments  may help by protecting skin from moisture and from friction. Antifungal powders, most commonly clotrimazole 1%, may also be used in conjunction with a barrier ointment. Diaper rash ointment can also help.

Fungal infections associated with intertrigo may be treated with prescription antifungals applied directly to the skin (in most cases) or systemic antifungals, including fluconazole, nystatin, and griseofulvin.

Intertrigo is also a known symptom of vitamin B6 deficiency.

See also
 Diaper rash
 List of skin diseases

References

External links 

 A.O.C.D.: Intertrigo
 eMedicine: Intertrigo (by Samuel Selden, M.D.)
 DERMAdoctor: Intertrigo (by Audrey Kunin, M.D.)

Dermatologic terminology
Inflammations